Serrasalmus geryi, the violet line piranha or Gery's piranha, is a species of fish  found in the lower Tocantins and Araguaia Rivers of Brazil. This rare Serrasalmus is the one piranha of the genus Serrasalmus that can coexist with others of the same species (though caution is advised). Gery's Piranha reaches sizes up to 12 inches in length.

Description
Body shape is similar to other compressus group members and are very laterally compressed such as; S. altuvei, S. hastatus, S. compressus and S. altispinis. The fish is distinctive at all ages with its broad stripe running from lower mouth to top of beginning of dorsal fin.

Color:
Silvery bodied fish with numerous small spots on the flanks. Anal fin is hyaline with a broad black margin. Pectoral and ventral fins are clear. A humeral spot may be present. Eyes silvery to reddish-orange.

Maximum size:
Approx. 25 cm. (10") TL.
Specimens over 20 cm. (8") TL are quite rare in captivity.

Sexing:
Not sexually dimorphic: males and females look similar.

Care
Tank requirements:
Recommended tank size for an adult specimen is 120x45x50 cm. (48x18x20").
Juvenile specimen can be kept in a smaller tank: minimum 60x30x30 cm. (24x12x12").
This is one of the few Serrasalmus species that have successfully been kept in a group for a while: minimum recommended size to attempt this is 150x50x60 cm. (60x20x24") - only to be attempted by very experienced piranha keepers who know exactly what they are doing, and know what risks are involved.

Plants, driftwood or rocks provide hiding places; the tank lights should be dimmed.
Heavy filtration required to deal with the large amounts of waste this fish produces. A powerhead can be added to provide currents.
Fish can be dangerous to hands and other extremities. Care is required in handling.

Water temperature:
24-29 degrees Celsius (76-84 degrees Fahrenheit).

Water chemistry:
pH should be between 6.0 - 8.0, ideal is slightly acidic to neutral water: pH 6.5 - 7.2
Soft water is preferred.

Compatible species:
Although this species has successfully been kept in a group, it is highly recommended to keep the Geryi Piranha as a solitary fish: it remains a parasitic and highly aggressive species.

Breeding:
No instances of captive breeding have been reported yet.

Diet:
Fish (whole, fillet or feeders *), shrimp, cockles, mussels, squid, insects, earthworms, pellets.
Food items such as poultry, mammal meat, and organ meat should be fed sparingly: once or twice a month at most. Meat needs to be unseasoned and trimmed of any fat.
On rare occasions this species accepts vegetables, nuts, seeds, or fruit as well.

 Live fish need to be quarantined first, so they are safe to feed (containing no diseases or parasites). Goldfish, minnows and other members of the Cyprinid family (Carp-like fish) should be avoided, as these fish contain growth-inhibiting hormones (Thaiminase/Vitamine B1 inhibitors) that could negatively affect the piranha's health and development.

References

External links 
 "Serrasalmus geryi" on FishBase

Serrasalmidae
Piranhas
Fish of the Tocantins River basin
Fish described in 1988